The Ministry of Industry, Mine and Trade is an Iranian government body responsible for the regulation and implementation of policies applicable to domestic and foreign trade and also regulation and implementation of policies applicable to industrial and mine sectors that formed on 3 August 2011. The ministry resulted from the merger of the Ministry of Industries and Mines and Ministry of Commerce.

List of Ministers

See also
 Cabinet of Iran
 Government of Iran
 Industry of Iran
 Economy of Iran

References

External links

Official Website

2011 establishments in Iran
Iran, Industries and Business
Industries and Business
Ministry of Industry, Mine and Trade (Iran)